Tannersville is a village in Greene County, New York, United States. The village is in the north-central part of the town of Hunter on Route 23A. The population was 539 at the 2010 census, up from 448 in 2000.

History 
The village was founded around lumber mills and tanneries. It was incorporated in 1895.

Tannersville's tanning business collapsed in the mid-19th century. It was gradually replaced by the summer resort trade, which reached its peak in 1882 when the railroad came to Tannersville. However, the rise of the automobile in the early 20th century led to a steady economic decline, as travelers were no longer rooted to one spot for an entire summer.

Due to its close proximity to Hunter Mountain ski area, it serves as the local commercial district, with inns, restaurants, and shopping.

Tannersville has experienced a revival in the 21st century. The Hunter Foundation has implemented the town-wide "Paint Program" — the vision of Elena Patterson, a local artist — with the help and support of Glenn Weyant who was the mayor at the time, corporate sponsors, and local residents. The Paint Project involves painting downtown buildings in multicolored pastels, often with cartoon-like pictures on the shutters. It has attracted waves of tourists who come to see the dramatic paint schemes. The project prompted much attention when it was publicized in The New York Times in 2003. The project was also featured on NBC's Today show, on CNBC, and on all three of the local Albany-based television networks. The village also received some attention for serving as the center of activities for the Catskill Jazz Factory artist development program.

Tannersville is experiencing an influx of tourists from both the New York and other areas, who are attracted to its abundant hiking trails, waterfalls, and old-time charm.

The Tannersville Main Street Historic District was listed on the National Register of Historic Places (NRHP) in 2008.  Other NRHP listed buildings are All Souls Church and Hathaway.

In November 2021, Tannersville was named the second Capital Region winner of the 5th round of the New York State Downtown Revitalization Initiative. The $10 million grant would enable the town to focus on economic development and improvements to enrichment. "With the impact COVID-19 has had on small businesses and communities, it is crucial that the state invest in their revitalization so we can come back better than before," Governor Kathy Hochul said. "This funding will help take Tannersville, a village rich with history, to the next level so that it may grow and flourish as an example of the best of what Upstate New York has to offer."

Mayors

Notable people 
 Maude Adams, actress, first American to play Peter Pan
 Josephine Daskam Bacon, Author, poet and playwright
 James Carroll Beckwith  American landscape, portrait and genre painter 
 Edward Coleman Delafield, president of Bank of America
 Mary Mapes Dodge, author of children's books
 Slow Joe Doyle, Major League Baseball pitcher
 Gil Hanse, golf course architect
 Howard Frank Mosher, author
 Candace Thurber Wheeler,  considered the Mother of American Interior Design

Geography
Tannersville is located in southern Greene County at  (42.193619, -74.139011), in the northern part of the town of Hunter.

NY 23A is Tannersville's Main Street, leading east  to Catskill and west  to Hunter village.

Demographics

As of the census of 2000, there were 448 people, 216 households, and 114 families residing in the village. The population density was 402.4 people per square mile (155.8/km2). There were 505 housing units at an average density of 453.6 per square mile (175.7/km2). The racial makeup of the village was 95.09% White, 0.89% African American, 0.22% Asian, 0.67% from other races, and 3.12% from two or more races. Hispanic or Latino of any race were 2.90% of the population.

There were 216 households, out of which 20.8% had children under the age of 18 living with them, 39.4% were married couples living together, 7.9% had a female householder with no husband present, and 46.8% were non-families. 40.3% of all households were made up of individuals, and 16.2% had someone living alone who was 65 years of age or older. The average household size was 2.07 and the average family size was 2.80.

In the village, the population was spread out, with 19.4% under the age of 18, 6.0% from 18 to 24, 24.3% from 25 to 44, 29.5% from 45 to 64, and 20.8% who were 65 years of age or older. The median age was 45 years. For every 100 females, there were 99.1 males. For every 100 females age 18 and over, there were 99.4 males.

The median income for a household in the village was $28,500, and the median income for a family was $37,500. Males had a median income of $27,708 versus $27,000 for females. The per capita income for the village was $15,318. About 10.7% of families and 18.5% of the population were below the poverty line, including 26.2% of those under age 18 and 10.4% of those age 65 or over.

Points of interest 
 Mountain Top Arboretum
 Huckleberry Rail Trail 
Mountain Top Library

References

External links
 Village of Tannersville official website
 Events and Info for Tannersville
 Town of Hunter
 Village of Tannersville information at Hunter Chamber of Commerce
 Mountain Top Library

Villages in New York (state)
Catskills
Villages in Greene County, New York